Fuegotrophon pallidus is a species of sea snail, a marine gastropod mollusk in the family Muricidae, the murex snails or rock snails.

Description
The length of the shell attains 21.9 mm.

Distribution
This marine species was found at the Strait of Magellan off Chile.

References

 Hombron, J.B. & Jacquinot, C.H. (1842-1854). Atlas d'histoire Naturelle zoologie par MM. Hombron et Jacquinot, chirurgiens de l'expédition. Voyage au Pole Sud et dans l'Océanie sur les corvettes l'Astrolabe et la Zélée éxecuté par ordre du roi pendant les années 1837–1838–1839–1840 sous le commandement de M. Dumont-d'Urville, capitaine de vaisseau, publié sous les auspices du département de la marine et sous la direction supérieure de M. Jacquinot, capitaine de vaisseau, commandant de la Zélée. Zoologie. Gide & Cie, Paris.
 Dell, R.K. (1972) Notes on nomenclature of some Mollusca from Antarctica and southern South America. Records of the Dominion Museum, 8, 21–42.

External links
 Broderip, W. J.; Sowerby, G. B., I. (1832-1833). [Descriptions of new species of shells from the collection formed by Mr. Cuming on the western coast of South America, and among the islands of the southern Pacific Ocean.. Proceedings of the Committee of Science and correspondence of the Zoological Society of London. 2: 25–33]
 Gould A.A. (1849). [Descriptions of new species of shells, brought home by the U. S. Exploring Expedition. Proceedings of the Boston Society of Natural History. 3: 83-85, 89-92, 106-108, 118-121 [May 1849], 140-144]
 Strebel H. (1908). Die Gastropoden. In: Wissenschaftliche Ergebnisse der Schwedischen Südpolar-Expedition 1901–1903 unter Leitung von Dr. Otto Nordenskjöld, Bd 6, Lief. 1: 111 pp., 6 pls. Stockholm
  Luca, J. D.; Zelaya, D. G. (2019). Gastropods from the Burdwood Bank (southwestern Atlantic): an overview of species diversity. Zootaxa. 4544(1): 41-78

pallidus
Gastropods described in 1833
Endemic fauna of Chile